Ray Silver Tomlin (October 10, 1899 – October 27, 1972) was the president of Paine College. Born in Arizona Territory, he moved with his family to a farm in Missouri and received a Bachelor of Divinity from the Garrett Bible Institute and a Master's degree from Northwestern University.

Paine College 
In 1923 he was appointed President of Paine College in Augusta, Georgia. The school was established at the end of the Civil War by the white and black Methodist churches to educate former slaves on how to become teachers and ministers. The original endowment included $16 raised in pennies from former slaves. Originally started as a high school, by 1903 sufficient college-level work was provided to justify changing the school’s name from Paine Institute to The Paine College. Tomlin – the white college president – believed that the school would be best served by hiring a black faculty which was not a popular position in Augusta, Georgia in the 1920s. In 1929 he was fired for his controversial stand. Punishing him for his position, the white Methodist church banished him to a poor circuit of churches in rural Missouri where he became a circuit preacher, traveling to a different church each Sunday. According to his family he was never bitter and spent the rest of his life ministering to the small farm communities in central Missouri.

Tomlin died on October 27, 1972 in Fayette, Missouri

References

1889 births
1972 deaths
Heads of universities and colleges in the United States
Northwestern University alumni
20th-century American academics